Júlio César Campozano and Roberto Quiroz were the defending champions but Quiroz decided not to participate.
Campozano played alongside Emilio Gómez, but they lost in the first round.
Martín Alund and Facundo Bagnis won the title, defeating Leonardo Mayer and Martín Ríos-Benítez 7–5, 7–6(7–5) in the final.

Seeds

Draw

Draw

References
 Main Draw

Challenger Ciudad de Guayaquil - Doubles
2012 Doubles